Hadi Sohrabi (born 2 February 1989 in Khomam) is an Iranian football midfielder who currently plays for Damash in Iran's Premier Football League.

Career
Sohrabi Started his career with Shahrdari Khomam. He start his senior career with Pegah Gilan under Nader Dastneshan management. He was a part of Damash until 2011. In Summer 2012 he joined Nassaji. After a season far from his city, he moved back to Damash. In 2014, he named as the club's captain of Damash after the departure of Mohammad Reza Mahdavi.

Club career statistics
 Last update: 16 May 2016

References

External links 
 Hadi Sohrabi  at PersianLeague.com

Iranian footballers
Association football midfielders
Pegah Gilan players
Nassaji Mazandaran players
Damash Gilan players
1989 births
Living people